Jeremy Pelt (born November 4, 1976, in California) is an American jazz trumpeter.

Career
Pelt studied classical trumpet as a child and focused on jazz after playing in a high school jazz ensemble. He studied at Berklee College of Music. Among those he has performed with are Ravi Coltrane, Roy Hargrove, Greg Osby, and Cassandra Wilson.

Discography
 Profile (Fresh Sound, 2002)
 Close to My Heart (Maxjazz, 2003)
 Insight (Criss Cross, 2003)
 Identity (Maxjazz, 2005)
 Shock Value: Live at Smoke (Maxjazz, 2007)
 November (Maxjazz, 2008)
 Men of Honor (HighNote, 2010)
 The Talented Mr. Pelt (HighNote, 2011)
 Soul (HighNote, 2012)
 Water and Earth (HighNote, 2013)
 Face Forward, Jeremy (HighNote, 2014)
 Tales, Musings and Other Reveries (HighNote, 2015)
 #Jiveculture (HighNote, 2016)
 High Art (HighNote, 2016)
 The Co-Op (Brown Brothers, 2017)
 Make Noise! (HighNote, 2017)
 Noir En Rouge, Live in Paris (HighNote, 2018)
 Jubilation! Celebrating Cannonball Adderley (Savant, 2018)
 The Artist (HighNote, 2019)
 Art of Intimacy Vol. 1 (HighNote, 2020)
 GRIOT: This is Important! (HighNote, 2021)

As sideman
With Vincent Herring
 Change the World (MusicMasters, 1997)
 All Too Real (HighNote, 2003)
 Mr. Wizard (HighNote, 2004)
 Ends and Means (HighNote, 2005)
 Night and Day (Smoke Sessions, 2015)

With Ralph Peterson Jr.
 The Art of War (Criss Cross, 2001)
 Subliminal Seduction (Criss Cross, 2002)
 Tests of Time (Criss Cross, 2003)

With Lonnie Plaxico
 Melange (Blue Note, 2001)
 Rhythm & Soul (Sirocco Music, 2003)
 Live at the Zinc Bar (Plaxmusic, 2007)

With others
 Eric Alexander, Chicago Fire (HighNote, 2014)
 J. D. Allen, Pharoah's Children (Criss Cross, 2001)
 Ben Allison, Layers of the City (Sonic Camera, 2017)
 Roni Ben-Hur, Keepin' It Open (Motema, 2007)
 David Chesky, Jazz in the New Harmonic (Chesky, 2013)
 David Chesky, Primal Scream (Chesky, 2015)
 Gerald Cleaver, Gerald Cleaver's Detroit (Fresh Sound, 2007)
 Gerald Cleaver, Live at Firehouse 12 (Sunnyside, 2019)
 Roxy Coss, Restless Idealism (Origin, 2016)
 Dena DeRose, We Won't Forget You (HighNote, 2014)
 Wayne Escoffery, Intuition (Nagel Heyer, 2004)
 Wayne Escoffery, Vortex (Sunnyside, 2018)
 David Finck, Future Day (Soundbrush, 2007)
 Al Foster, Inspirations & Dedications (Smoke Sessions, 2019)
 Frank Foster, We Do It Diff'rent (Mapleshade, 2002)
 Jared Gold, Reemergence (Strikezone 2018)
 Noah Haidu, Infinite Distances (Cellar Live, 2017)
 Louis Hayes, Maximum Firepower (Savant, 2006)
 Louis Hayes, Live at Cory Weed's Cellar Jazz Club (Cellar Live, 2014)
 Kathy Kosins, Vintage (Mahogany, 2005)
 Mike LeDonne, FiveLive (Savant, 2008)
 Mike LeDonne, AwwlRIGHT! (Savant, 2015)
 Harold Mabern, Afro Blue (Smoke Sessions, 2015)
 Rene Marie, Vertigo (Maxjazz, 2001)
 Rene Marie, Serene Renegade (Maxjazz, 2004)
 Mingus Big Band, Tonight at Noon... Three or Four Shades of Love (Dreyfus, 2002)
 Mingus Big Band, I Am Three (Sunnyside, 2005)
 Lewis Nash, The Highest Mountain (Cellar Live, 2012)
 John L. Nelson, Don't Play with Love (Maken It Music, 2018)
 Jaleel Shaw, Optimism (Changu, 2008)
 Wayne Shorter, Alegria (Verve, 2003)
 Jarek Smietana & Gary Bartz, African Lake (Starling, 2000)
 Jim Snidero, Jubilation! (Savant, 2018)
 Jim Snidero, Waves of Calm (Savant, 2019)
 Somi, Red Soil in My Eyes (World Village 2007)
 Soulive, Doin' Something (Blue Note, 2001)
 Soulive, Steady Groovin (Blue Note, 2005)
 Baptiste Trotignon, Suite (Naive, 2009)
 Camille Thurman, Waiting for the Sunrise (Chesky, 2018)
 Cedar Walton, Seasoned Wood (HighNote, 2008)
 Gerald Wilson, In My Time (Mack Avenue, 2005)
 Gerald Wilson, Legacy (Mack Avenue, 2011)
 World Saxophone Quartet, Political Blues (Justin Time, 2006)

References

American jazz trumpeters
American male trumpeters
Jazz musicians from California
1976 births
Living people
21st-century trumpeters
21st-century American male musicians
American male jazz musicians
HighNote Records artists
Criss Cross Jazz artists